Jenny Yokobori (born February 11, 1997) is an American voice actress. She is best known for voicing Yoimiya in Genshin Impact and Kuromi in Hello Kitty and Friends Supercute Adventures.

Career 
In 2014, Yokobori made began her voice acting career when she voiced the character known as the Lady of the Sea Discordia in the online video game Smite.

Yokobori provided the US voice of Dashi in the children's animated series Octonauts, which premiered on Netflix in 2020.

In 2021, Yokobori provided the English voice of Yoimiya in the video game Genshin Impact. The same year, she replaced Tress MacNeille as the voice of Kumiko in The Simpsons, starting with the thirty-second season in response to the George Floyd protests and Harry Shearer being recast as the voice of Dr. Hibbert. She is currently the youngest voice actor in the main voice cast and the only one born after the series started airing in 1989.

Filmography

Film and TV

Video games

Animation

Writer/Director

References

External links 
 

Living people
Actresses of Japanese descent
American actresses of Japanese descent
American video game actresses
Place of birth missing (living people)
American voice actresses
21st-century American actresses
1997 births